Town of Bath Historic District is a national historic district located at Berkeley Springs, Morgan County, West Virginia.  The district encompasses 218 contributing buildings, 3 contributing sites, 6 contributing structures, and 1 contributing object.  It consists of the community's central business district, along with the previously-listed Berkeley Springs State Park, a small industrial area east of the downtown, and residential areas surrounding the downtown which also contain several churches and two cemeteries. The buildings are generally two stories in height and are primarily built of brick, wood, and concrete block, and set on foundations of native limestone and brick. Located within the district boundaries are the previously listed Berkeley Springs Train Depot, T. H. B. Dawson House, the Clarence Hovermale House also known as the Mendenhall 1884 Inn, the Sloat-Horn-Rossell House, and the Judge John W. Wright Cottage.

It was listed on the National Register of Historic Places in 2009.

References

Bath (Berkeley Springs), West Virginia
National Register of Historic Places in Morgan County, West Virginia
Historic districts in Morgan County, West Virginia
Buildings and structures in Morgan County, West Virginia
Historic districts on the National Register of Historic Places in West Virginia